Beilin is the only district of the city of Suihua, Heilongjiang, People's Republic of China.

Administrative divisions
There are twelve subdistricts, 15 towns, and five townships in the district:

Subdistricts

Towns

Townships
Hongqi Manchu Ethnic Township
Liangang Township
Xinhua Township
Wuying Township
Xinghe Korean Ethnic Township

Notes and references 

Beilin
Suihua